Évelyne Bouix (born 22 April 1953) is a French film actress and stage actress. She has appeared in 61 films from 1970.

She was made Chevalier (Knight) of the Ordre national du Mérite in 1999.

Selected filmography
 Rene the Cane (1977)
 Les Misérables (1982)
 Édith et Marcel (1983)
 A Man and a Woman: 20 Years Later (1986)
 The Post Office Girl (1988, TV film)
 Beaumarchais (1996)
 Remake (2003)
 Musée haut, musée bas (2008)

Notes

External links

1953 births
Living people
People from Charenton-le-Pont
Knights of the Ordre national du Mérite
French film actresses
French stage actresses